Order of Saint Michael is a French dynastic order of knighthood founded in 1469 by King Louis XI of France.

Order of Saint Michael may also refer to:

Chivalric orders 
 Order of Saint Michael of the Wing, a Portuguese Catholic dynastic order traditionally founded in 1147 by King Afonso I of Portugal
 Order of Saint Michael (Bavaria), a Bavarian order of knighthood founded in 1693 by Joseph Clemens of Bavaria
 Order of St Michael and St George, a British dynastic order of knighthood founded in 1818 by George, Prince Regent, later George IV of the United Kingdom
 Order of Saint Michael the Archangel, a Russian dynastic order of knighthood founded in 1988 by Grand Duke Vladimir Kirillovich of Russia

Religious orders 
 Congregation of Saint Michael the Archangel, a catholic religious institute